The 5th local elections were held in South Korea on 2 June 2010. The voter turnout reached 54.4%, the highest in 15 years.


Voter turnout by region

Provincial-level elections 

The ruling GNP was able to win 4 out of 7 mayoral seats but suffer by massive landslide on the gubernatorial election winning only 2 out of 9 seats. On the other hand, DP was able to capture 2 mayoral seats and swept 5 out of 9 gubernatorial seats. The LFP won Daejeon while two independent candidates won gubernatorial seats in South Gyeongsang Province and the other in Jeju Province.

Metropolitan city mayors

Provincial governors

Provincial-level councilors

Summary

Constituency seats

Proportional representation seats

Municipal-level elections

Municipal-level mayors

Summary

By region

Municipal-level councilors

Summary

Constituency seats

References

External links 
 5th local elections results - the Central Election Management Committee

2010 elections in South Korea
2010